The Labour and Socialist International (LSI; , SAI) was an international organization of socialist and labour parties, active between 1923 and 1940. The group was established through a merger of the rival Vienna International and the Berne International, and was the forerunner of the present-day Socialist International.

The LSI had a history of rivalry with the Communist International (Comintern), with which it competed over the leadership of the international socialist and labour movement. However, unlike the Comintern, the LSI maintained no direct control over the actions of its sections, being constituted as a federation of autonomous national parties.

History

Founding

Despite the hostility expressed by the Communist International, the left wing of the social democratic movement sought an international "union of the whole proletariat" through 1922. This initiative finally came to a close at the end of the year with the convocation of the 4th World Congress of the Comintern, which decisively rejected calls for a broad and inclusive international body.

This rejection by the Communist wing of the international socialist movement left the center and right — in the form of the Vienna International and the London International, respectively — to patch together their own joint international body. Planning for such a body began in January 1923, a month after the conclusion of the Comintern's 4th World Congress, with the Executive Committees of the Vienna and London groups issuing a joint statement condemning the Communists' decision. The two Executive Committees subsequently issued a convention call for a unification congress in May.

On May 21, 1923, some 620 delegates representing 41 socialist political parties in 30 countries was convened in Hamburg, Germany to bring about the unification of the two Internationals. A wide array of political tendencies were represented among these delegates, running the ideological gamut from activists in the left wing of the French Section of the Workers' International (SFIO) and the Independent Social Democratic Party of Germany (USPD) to moderate reformists of the British Labour Party.

The gathering was dominated by 80 delegates of the Social Democratic Party of Germany (SPD), including among its membership such esteemed leaders of the international socialist movement as Karl Kautsky, Eduard Bernstein, and Rudolf Hilferding. Other prominent figures in attendance included Arthur Henderson and Sidney Webb of the British Labour Party; Friedrich Adler and Otto Bauer, and Karl Renner of the Social Democratic Party of Austria (SPÖ); Emile Vandervelde and Camille Huysmans of the Belgian Labour Party (BWP); and the émigré Russian Mensheviks Pavel Axelrod, Raphael Abramovitch, and Fyodor Dan, among others.

The unity congress voted to establish itself as a new International under the name "Labour and Socialist International" (LSI). In marked difference from the Communist movement, no preconditions were established for admission, nor was any binding policy program adopted. Instead the Hamburg Congress issued a manifesto stating that the new International "must grow naturally from the process through which Socialist parties get adapted to one another." Total agreement on fundamental principles was not expected "at the moment of its birth," but the desire was voiced that establishment of the new international body would over time serve as "one of the most important conditions for the harmonizing of their views."

Structure
The LSI was to remain a federation of fully independent and autonomous political parties — groups which were freely allowed under organizational statutes to determine their own internal policies and programs. The organization was modeled upon the old Second International, with supreme authority vested in the international congress, which could be convened at any time upon the demand of 10 or more affiliated parties, so long as these represented at least a quarter of the organization's voting strength.

Governance between congresses was to be conducted by an Executive Committee, with its participants elected by the member parties. The Executive Committee was given the power to elect its own chair and other officers, to determine the location for its central office, and to elect a 9-member Bureau for prior consideration of matters of concern in advance of meetings of the full Executive Committee. The Executive Committee was additionally to establish a 6-member special committee of local members residing at or near the seat of the committee, who were to be responsible for supervising the work of the Executive and its officers and arranging meetings of the Bureau and the Executive Committee.

The first Executive Committee, elected by the 1923 Hamburg Congress, included Arthur Henderson of the British Labour Party as chairman, Harry Gosling of the British Labour Party as treasurer, with the Austrian Friedrich Adler and the Englishman Tom Shaw joining as members of the group's Secretariat. London was chosen as the seat of the Executive Committee.

Development
The LSI functioned as a continuation of the Second International, and was often referred to as the "Second International" by the Comintern.

The Social Democratic Party of Germany was the dominant party within the LSI.

Response to Nazism
With the rise of Nazism in Europe, there was increased pressure on the LSI and Comintern to cooperate. On February 19, 1933, the LSI Bureau issued a call for joint action of the SPD and the Communist Party of Germany against Adolf Hitler's regime. The Comintern responded by stating that they were not convinced of the sincerity of the declaration. However, the Comintern did soon call its national sections to form united fronts together with social democratic parties locally. The LSI, on its side, did not accept the notion of local social democrats forming united fronts with the communist parties. However, as the Comintern adopted a more conciliatory tone, the resistance of the LSI against forming such united fronts on the national level softened.

Within the LSI, a north-south cleavage emerged, as the Mediterranean LSI parties built fronts with the communists whilst the British and Scandinavian parties rejected the notion of cooperation with the communists. With the German party in disarray, the British and Scandinavians became more influential within the LSI. Thus the space for socialist-communist cooperation decreased. On September 25, 1934, the Comintern Executive issued a call for 'peace negotiations' between the two internationals, but the LSI rejected the offer.

After the outbreak of the Spanish Civil War, the LSI and the International Federation of Trade Unions launched an 'Aid for Spain' campaign. The LSI/IFTU relief efforts were channelled through the Spanish Socialist Workers' Party (PSOE) and Unión General de Trabajadores (UGT).

Colonial question
Although the communists opposed colonialism, the LSI were generally supportive of colonialism. For example, the participation of the British Independent Labour Party in the communist-sponsored League against Imperialism caused a controversy within LSI, and the ILP was asked to break its ties with the League. However, the support of the LSI for colonialism was not complete. Regarding the Rif War, the second LSI congress, held in Marseille August 22–27, 1925, adopted a resolution calling for support of the independence of the Rif and urging the League of Nations to accept the Rif Republic as a member.

Congresses

List of members of the LSI

b = Bureau member

Other Executive members: International Women's Commission: Adelheid Popp (February 1924 – September 1935), Alice Pels (September 1935 – 1940)
Socialist Youth International: Karl Heinz (February 1924 – October 1932), Erich Ollenhauer (October 1932 – 1940)

Source:

Footnotes